Scrophularia marilandica, also called late figwort, Maryland figwort, carpenter's square, or eastern figwort, is a flowering plant in the family Scrophulariaceae, native throughout eastern and central North America, where it is found growing in dry woods from Manitoba and Quebec south to Texas and Florida.

They are commonly visited by hummingbirds in late summer.

Past common names for Scrophularia marilandica have included heal-all, pilewort, and scrofula-plant. It was once used in an ailment called "figs" to treat piles. During the 19th century, the root was used in an infusion to treat insomnia and anxiety.

References

External links

marilandica
Flora of North America
Plants described in 1753
Taxa named by Carl Linnaeus